St. Joseph Parish - originally established in 1905 for Polish immigrants in Rockville, Connecticut, United States. St. Joseph church has been a multi-ethnic parish since the 1950s under Fr. Hyacinth Lepak (1949–1975) and continues to be a diversely ethnic American parish community. ( See "History" link at www.stjosephct.org for additional background). 
Visit St. Joseph Church on your tablet or phone for more parish community news and resources.

Pastors 
 Rev. Charles Wotypka (1905–1908)
 Rev. Joseph Culkowski (1908–1909)
 Rev. Maximilian Soltysek (1909–1917)
 Rev. Leon Wierzynski (1917–1918)
 Rev. Franciszek Wladasz (1918–1922)
 Rev. Stefan Bartkowski (1922–1927)
 Rev. Zygmunt Woroniecki (1927–1949)
 Rev. Hyacinth Lepak (1949–1975)
 Rev. Aloysius Kisluk (1975–1988)
 Rev. Joseph Hanks (1988–1994)
 Rev. Joseph M. Olczak (1994–2008)
 Fr. Krzysztof Wieliczko O.S.P.P.E. (2008–2010)
 Fr. Krzysztof Drybka O.S.P.P.E. (2010- 2021)
 Fr. Bogdan Olzacki O.S.P.P.E. (2016- 2021)
 Rev. Tadeusz Zadorozny (2021-present)

Bibliography 
 
 
 
 The Official Catholic Directory in USA

External links 
 St. Joseph - Diocesan information
 St. Joseph - ParishesOnline.com
 Diocese of Norwich
 

Roman Catholic parishes of Diocese of Norwich
Polish-American Roman Catholic parishes in Connecticut
Buildings and structures in Rockville, Connecticut
Churches in Tolland County, Connecticut